Sheykh Shams ol Din (also Romanized as Sheykh Shams ol Dīn; also known as Sheykh Shamseddīn) is a village in Shahid Modarres Rural District, in the Central District of Shushtar County, Khuzestan Province, Iran. At the 2006 census, its population was 899, in 169 families.

References 

Populated places in Shushtar County